The  is an underground rapid transit system in Osaka, Japan, operated by Osaka Metro. It was the first linear motor rapid transit line constructed in Japan (and the first outside North America, predated only by the Intermediate Capacity Transit System in Vancouver). Station numbers are indicated by the letter "N".

History
The line is named after Nagahori-dori, a major avenue which it follows through central Osaka, and the Tsurumi-ryokuchi, a park in northeastern Osaka which hosted the International Flower and Greenery Exposition in 1990. The line was built not only to provide access to the park during the exhibition, but also to relieve congestion from the Chūō Line.

Under its original plan, the line would have provided access to the Osaka prefectural government offices near Osaka Castle. However, the presence of underground artifacts around the castle area made this plan impractical, and the line was thus shifted farther south, which also provided a better connection with the Chūō Line. On 11 December 1996, the line was opened as far as Shinsaibashi in downtown Osaka, and renamed the Nagahori Tsurumi-ryokuchi Line.

On 29 August 1997, the line was further extended westward to Taishō and eastward to Kadoma-minami.

Over the course of fiscal 2010, the 16 stations within Osaka City were outfitted with automatic platform gates, similar to those already in use on the Imazatosuji Line. At Taishō, the first station to be so equipped, the gates started operation on 7 July 2010. The final station, Kadoma-minami, had them installed over the course of October 2011, with operation starting on 31 October of that year.

Line data 
 The line is entirely underground, with no above-ground section. 
 Block signalling: In-cab signalling
 Train protection system: CS-ATC, ATO
 Cars per train: 4 (1990 – present)
 Maximum possible cars per train (platform length): 6

Stations

Stopping patterns 
All trains stop at every station on their route. Most trains operate between Taishō and Kadoma-minami; trains also operate shortened services which run from Taishō to either Shinsaibashi or Yokozutsumi during events held at Osaka Dome. Trains run every 2–4 minutes during peak hours, and every 7 minutes during off-peak hours.

Rolling stock
 70 series four-car EMUs (since 1990)
 80 series four-car EMUs (since 2006)
Trains are automatically driven using ATO with a single driver on board to open and close the doors and to manually drive the train in emergency situations or when ATO breaks down or is not available. All trains are stored at Tsurumi-ryokuchi-kita depot (on the Imazatosuji Line) and maintained at Tsurumi workshop.

In order to increase the transportation capacity of the Nagahori Tsurumi-ryokuchi Line, Series 80 cars of the Imazatosuji Line, which were made redundant after the 2013 timetable revision, were converted for the Nagahori Tsurumi-ryokuchi Line and started operation in mid-March 2019.

References

Osaka Metro
Rail transport in Osaka Prefecture
Standard gauge railways in Japan
Linear motor metros
1990 establishments in Japan
Railway lines opened in 1990